Marin Dokuzovski (born July 14, 1960, in Skopje) is a Macedonian former professional basketball coach.

Career
Dokuzovski played club basketball at the senior level from 1978 to 1989 with the Yugoslav League club Rabotnički.

Dokuzovski coached in the following clubs: Rabotnički, MZT Skopje, Polo Trejd Strumica, PBC Lukoil Academic and Sigal Prishtina.

Clubs

Playing career
1978-89: KK Rabotnicki: Yugoslav League

Head coach
1989-94: Rabotnički(youth team)
1994-00: Rabotnički: Macedonian League
2000-01: MZT Skopje: Macedonian League
2002:    Polo Trejd Strumica: Macedonian League
2003-04: Rabotnički: Macedonian League
2004-06: Lukoil Academic: Bulgarian League(assistant)
2006-07: Lukoil Academic: Bulgarian League
2007-09: Rabotnički: Macedonian League
2009-11: Macedonia national team
2011-13: Lukoil Academic: Bulgarian League
2014:    Sigal Prishtina: Kosovar League
2014-:   Rabotnički: Macedonian League

Head coaching career with Macedonian national teams
1996-97: Macedonia U-18 national basketball team
1997-99: Macedonia national basketball team(assistant)
1999-00: Macedonia U-20 national basketball team
2000-01: Macedonia national basketball team
2010-12: Macedonia national basketball team

Championships and cups as head coach

European club continental championships
2003-04: KK Rabotnicki: FIBA Europe Cup South Conference (Finalist)
2008-09: KK Rabotnicki: EUROHOLD Balkan League (Finalist)

National domestic league championships
1994-95: KK Rabotnicki: Macedonian League
1995-96: KK Rabotnicki: Macedonian League
1996-97: KK Rabotnicki: Macedonian League
1997-98: KK Rabotnicki: Macedonian League
1998-99: KK Rabotnicki: Macedonian League
2003-04: KK Rabotnicki: Macedonian League
2005-06: PBC Lukoil Academic: Bulgarian League
2006-07: PBC Lukoil Academic: Bulgarian League
2008-09: KK Rabotnicki: Macedonian League
2011-12: PBC Lukoil Academic: Bulgarian League
2013-14: Sigal Prishtina: Kosovar League
2017-18: KK Rabotnicki: Macedonian League

National domestic cup championships
1997-98: KK Rabotnicki: Macedonian Cup
2004-05: KK Rabotnicki: Macedonian Cup
2005-06: PBC Lukoil Academic: Bulgarian Cup
2006-07: PBC Lukoil Academic: Bulgarian Cup
2010-11: KK Rabotnicki: Macedonian Cup
2011-12: PBC Lukoil Academic: Bulgarian Cup

Honours
Macedonian Coach of the Year - 1999 and 2011
Eurobasket.com All-Bulgarian A1 Co-coach of the Year - 2005

Notes

External links

1960 births
Living people
Macedonian basketball coaches
Sportspeople from Skopje